Ampitana is a town and commune in Madagascar. It belongs to the district of Ambohimahasoa, which is a part of Haute Matsiatra Region. The population of the commune was estimated to be approximately 10,000 in 2001 commune census.

Only primary schooling is available. The majority 95% of the population of the commune are farmers.  The most important crop is rice, while other important products are peanuts, beans, cassava and sweet potatoes. Services provide employment for 5% of the population.

References and notes 

Populated places in Haute Matsiatra